Thellusson v Woodford (1799) 4 Ves 227 is an English trusts law case. It was a lawsuit resulting from the will of Peter Thellusson, an English merchant (1737–1797).

Facts
Peter Thellusson directed the income of his property, consisting of real estate of the annual value of about £5,000 and personal estate amounting to over £600,000, to be accumulated during the lives of his children, grandchildren and great-grandchildren, living at the time of his death, and the survivor of them. The property so accumulated, which, it is estimated, would have amounted to over £14,000,000, was to be divided among such descendants as might be alive on the death of the survivor of those lives during which the accumulation was to continue.

Judgment
The bequest was held valid. In 1856, there was a protracted lawsuit as to who were the actual heirs. It was decided by the House of Lords (9 June 1859) in favour of Lord Rendlesham and Charles Sabine Augustus Thellusson. Owing, however, to the heavy expenses, the amount inherited was not much larger than that originally bequeathed.

Significance
To prevent such a disposition of property in the future, the Accumulations Act 1800 (known also as the "Thellusson Act") was passed, by which it was enacted that no property should be accumulated for any longer term than either
 the life of the grantor; or
 the term of twenty-one years from his death; or
 the minority of any person living or en ventre sa mere at the time of the death of the grantor; or
 the minority of any person who, if of full age, would be entitled to the income directed to be accumulated.

The Act, however, did not extend to any provision for payment of the debts of the grantor or of any other person, nor to any provision for raising portions for the children of the settlor, or any person interested under the settlement, nor to any direction touching the produce of timber or wood upon any lands or tenements. The act was extended to heritable property in Scotland by the Entail Amendment Act 1848, but does not apply to property in Ireland. The act was further amended by the Accumulations Act 1892, which forbids accumulations for the purpose of the purchase of land for any longer period than during the minority of any person or persons who, if of full age, would be entitled to receive the income.

It is believed that the Thellusson Will case provided the basis for the fictional case of Jarndyce and Jarndyce in Charles Dickens' novel Bleak House.

See also
 English trusts law
 Wellington R. Burt
 Jarndyce and Jarndyce

Notes

References
The Practice of the Commissary Courts in Scotland, 1859, William Alexander
P Polden, Peter Thellusson's Will of 1797 and Its Consequences on Chancery Law (2002)

English trusts case law
House of Lords cases
1859 in case law
1859 in British law
Wills and testaments by person
English law articles needing infoboxes